KRSL (990 AM) is a radio station licensed to Russell, Kansas, United States, the station serves the west Kansas area. The station is currently owned by White Communications, L.L.C.

KRSL carries Kansas City Royals baseball (except weekday games), Kansas State Wildcats football and basketball and Russell High School football, basketball and baseball. The AM signal for KRSL can be received in the daytime as far west as Colby, as far east as Junction City and as far south as Hesston.

References

External links

RSL
Classic country radio stations in the United States
Radio stations established in 1973
1973 establishments in Kansas